The flag of the Commonwealth of Kentucky, United States, was adopted on March 26, 1918.

History
The flag was designed by Jesse Cox Burgess, an art teacher in Frankfort, the state capital. It was adopted by the Kentucky General Assembly on March 26, 1918.

Design 

The flag consists of the Commonwealth's seal on a navy blue field, surrounded by the words "Commonwealth of Kentucky" above and sprigs of goldenrod, the state flower, below.

The seal depicts a pioneer and a statesman embracing.  Popular belief claims that the buckskin-clad man on the left is Daniel Boone, who was largely responsible for the exploration of Kentucky, and the man in the suit on the right is Henry Clay, Kentucky's most famous statesman. However, the official explanation is that the men represent all frontiersmen and statesmen, rather than any specific persons.

In 2001, the North American Vexillological Association surveyed its members on the designs of the 72 Canadian provincial, U.S. state, and U.S. territorial flags; Kentucky's flag was ranked 66th.

Pledge 
In 2000, the General Assembly adopted the following pledge of allegiance to the flag of Kentucky:

See also 

 Commonwealth of Kentucky
 Symbols of the Commonwealth of Kentucky
 Seal of the Commonwealth of Kentucky

References

External links 
 Kentucky's State Flag (Kentucky Department for Libraries and Archives)

United States state flags
Flag
Flags of Kentucky